Rotylenchus is a genus of nematodes belonging to the family Hoplolaimidae.

The genus has almost cosmopolitan distribution.

Species:

Rotylenchus abnormecaudatus 
Rotylenchus acuspicaudatus 
Rotylenchus agnetis 
Rotylenchus alii 
Rotylenchus alius 
Rotylenchus alpinus 
Rotylenchus aqualamus 
Rotylenchus aquaticus 
Rotylenchus arasbaranensis 
Rotylenchus ascalpi 
Rotylenchus bialaebursus 
Rotylenchus blothrotylus 
Rotylenchus brevicaudatus 
Rotylenchus breviglans 
Rotylenchus buxophilus 
Rotylenchus capensis 
Rotylenchus capitatus 
Rotylenchus capsicumi 
Rotylenchus castilloi 
Rotylenchus catbarinae 
Rotylenchus catharinae 
Rotylenchus caudaphasmidius 
Rotylenchus cazorlaensis 
Rotylenchus colbrani 
Rotylenchus conicaudatus 
Rotylenchus corsicus 
Rotylenchus cretensis 
Rotylenchus cypriensis 
Rotylenchus dalhousiensis 
Rotylenchus dalikhaniensis 
Rotylenchus echelimae 
Rotylenchus eximius 
Rotylenchus fallorobustus 
Rotylenchus fragaricus 
Rotylenchus glabratus 
Rotylenchus goodeyi 
Rotylenchus graecus 
Rotylenchus helenae 
Rotylenchus hopperi 
Rotylenchus incognitus 
Rotylenchus incultus 
Rotylenchus indorobustus 
Rotylenchus iranicus 
Rotylenchus ivanovae 
Rotylenchus jagatpurensis 
Rotylenchus karooensis 
Rotylenchus kenti 
Rotylenchus landii 
Rotylenchus laurentinus 
Rotylenchus lobalus 
Rotylenchus lobatus 
Rotylenchus mabelei 
Rotylenchus magnus 
Rotylenchus mesorobustus 
Rotylenchus microstriatus 
Rotylenchus mirus 
Rotylenchus multicinctus 
Rotylenchus neorobustus 
Rotylenchus nexus 
Rotylenchus obtusus 
Rotylenchus orientalis 
Rotylenchus ouensensis 
Rotylenchus pakistanensis 
Rotylenchus pararobustus 
Rotylenchus phaliurus 
Rotylenchus pini 
Rotylenchus provincialis 
Rotylenchus pumilis 
Rotylenchus pumilus 
Rotylenchus quartus 
Rotylenchus ranapoi 
Rotylenchus rhomboides 
Rotylenchus robustus 
Rotylenchus rugatocuticulatus 
Rotylenchus sabarlyi 
Rotylenchus stasilinicus 
Rotylenchus triannulatus 
Rotylenchus troncapitatus 
Rotylenchus uniformis 
Rotylenchus unisexus 
Rotylenchus urmiaensis 
Rotylenchus usitatus 
Rotylenchus vitis 
Rotylenchus wallacei

References

Nematodes